George Washington Gordon (October 5, 1836 – August 9, 1911) was a general in the Confederate States Army during the American Civil War. After the war, he practiced law in Pulaski, Tennessee, where the Ku Klux Klan was formed. He became one of the Klan's first members. In 1867, Gordon became the Klan's first Grand Dragon for the Realm of Tennessee, and wrote its "Precept," a book describing its organization, purpose, and principles. He was also a member of the United States House of Representatives for the 10th congressional district of Tennessee.

Early life
Gordon was born on October 5, 1836, in Pulaski, Tennessee. His father was Andrew Gordon and his mother, Eliza K. Gordon. He grew up in Mississippi and Texas. Gordon graduated from the Western Military Institute in Nashville, Tennessee, in 1859. He worked on the Nashville & Northwestern Railway.

Civil War
At the start of the Civil War, Gordon enlisted in the military service of the Confederacy and became drillmaster of the 11th Regiment, Tennessee Infantry, which saw action defending the Cumberland Gap during the winter and spring months of 1862.  Gordon became regimental commander when James E. Rains assumed command of Carter L. Stevenson's brigade, and fought at the Battle of Tazewell on August 6, 1862. In November 1862 he became the regiment's colonel. Gordon was promoted to brigadier general in August 1864, and was one of the youngest Confederate generals. Gordon led Vaughn's Brigade, in Maj. Gen. John C. Brown's division, at the Battle of Franklin (November 30, 1864), where he was wounded and captured. Many of the men he led are buried at McGavock Confederate Cemetery in Franklin, Tennessee. Gordon was sent to the prisoner-of-war camp at Fort Warren until he was paroled in the summer of 1865.

Postbellum career
After the war, Gordon studied law at Cumberland University, was admitted to the bar, and practiced in Memphis, Tennessee, until 1883. He was appointed one of the railroad commissioners of Tennessee. He received an appointment in the Department of the Interior in 1885, as special Indian agent in Arizona and Nevada, and he served until 1889. He returned to Memphis and resumed the practice of law. He was the superintendent of Memphis city schools between 1889 and 1907.

Ku Klux Klan involvement

The KKK (the Klan) was formed by veterans of the Confederate Army in Pulaski, Tennessee, in 1866 and soon expanded throughout the state and beyond. Gordon was an early initiate and likely wrote the organization's original Prescript in 1867 and its revised edition the following year. Following Gordon's death, his widow, Minnie, claimed that he had been the original Grand Wizard of the Klan and that it was he, not Nathan Bedford Forrest, who disbanded it.

Political career
Gordon was elected as a Democrat to the Sixtieth, Sixty-first, and Sixty-second Congresses. He served from March 4, 1907, until his death in Memphis. He was interred in Elmwood Cemetery.

See also

List of American Civil War generals (Confederate)
List of United States Congress members who died in office (1900–49)

Notes

References
 Allison, John. Notable Men of Tennessee. Personal and Genealogical With Portraits. Volume 2. Atlanta: Southern Historical Association, 1905. Retrieved January 14, 2016.
 Cheathem, Mark R., and Emily J. Taylor. “Confederate General George Washington Gordon and the Ku Klux Klan.” West Tennessee Historical Society Papers 67 (2013): 36-57. 
 Eicher, John H., and David J. Eicher, Civil War High Commands. Stanford: Stanford University Press, 2001. .
 History of 11th Tennessee Infantry Regiment (Confederate), American Civil War
 Horn, Stanley F. Invisible Empire: The Story of the Ku Klux Klan from 1866 to 1871, Patterson Smith Publishing Corporation: Montclair, NJ, 1939.
 Hubbard, John Milton, Notes of a Private. By John Milton Hubbard, Company E, 7th Tennessee Regiment. Forrest's Cavalry Corps, C.S.A..
 Martinez, James Michael, Carpetbaggers, Cavalry, and the Ku Klux Klan, Rowman & Littlefield Publishers, Inc., 2007, p. 15. Retrieved June 20, 2009
 Sifakis, Stewart. Who Was Who in the Civil War. New York: Facts On File, 1988. .
 Warner, Ezra J. Generals in Gray: Lives of the Confederate Commanders. Baton Rouge: Louisiana State University Press, 1959. . Retrieved on 2008-10-13
 George W. Gordon, late a representative from Tennessee, Memorial addresses delivered in the House of Representatives and Senate frontispiece 1913

External links

 Political Graveyard

Ku Klux Klan Grand Dragons
Confederate States Army brigadier generals
American Civil War prisoners of war
1836 births
1911 deaths
People from Pulaski, Tennessee
Democratic Party members of the United States House of Representatives from Tennessee
19th-century American politicians